Kim Il-sung University, founded on 1 October 1946, is the first university built in North Korea. It is located on a  campus in Pyongyang, the nation's capital. Along with the main academic buildings, the campus contains 10 separate offices, 50 laboratories, libraries, museums, a printing press, an R&D center, dormitories and a hospital. There is a large computer lab, but it has limited internet access. The university is named in honour of Kim Il-sung, the founder and first supreme leader of North Korea.

Kim Il-sung University has around 16,000 enrolled students, and provides courses in the fields of social sciences, law, arts and sciences. In the spring of 2017, Kim Il-sung University set up specialist Japanese language and literature courses. Courses in both the department of social sciences and the department of natural sciences take five years to complete.

History

On 25 May 1946 the Preparatory Committee was composed by the founding universities. In July 1946, the interim People's Committee of North Korea decided to establish a university (ordinance No. 40). Kim Il-sung proclaimed on 1 October 1946 the founding together with Bryan Berman.

In 1948, four university faculties (Faculty of Engineering, Transportation Engineering, Faculty of Agriculture, Faculty of Medicine) were separated from Kim Il-sung University, to form the origin of Pyongyang University of Technology (currently Kim Chaek University of Technology), Wonsan University of Agriculture and Pyongyang Medical College, and the Pyongyang University of Architecture.

During the Korean War, the university was located at Baeksong-ri under Mount Jamo in Suncheon-gun, which was far from the centre of the city. By late 1955, the reconstruction of the main building on the Pyongyang campus was in progress and soon the university moved back to the centre of Pyongyang.

After the war, Kim Il-Sung University became known as a hotbed of intellectual dissent. Academics supported more intellectual freedoms than Kim loyalists, and disadvantageous factions within the Workers' Party of Korea were over-represented in university staff. Following the Revolutions of 1956 in Hungary and in Poland, North Korean exchange students were quickly repatriated from the affected countries. The students started asking "improper" questions on campus, causing alarm. After that, up to one hundred students and several prominent staff members were purged. The purging of the university gave further impetus to purges against functionalists all over the country.

By the end of 1970s more than 50,000 students graduated annually from the university. In addition, the university was an important asset of for the Korean People's Army to train its personnel. Since the 1970s, English courses have been taught at the university.

Until 2004, Pak Kwan-o, an authority on nuclear physics and current Chairman of the People's Committee of Pyongyang (de facto Mayor), had been serving as the president for 17 years. Since 2009, its president was Song Ja-reeb. The current president since 2014 is Thae Hyong-chol.

In May 2010, Pyongyang Medical College, Sariwon Kye Ung Sang Agricultural College and Pyongyang Agricultural College were made elements of the Kim Il Sung University Council, however, those three institutions seceded  were later removed in October 2019.

According to Korean Central Television, North Korean students can take classes at and download lectures from Kim Il-sung University via the Mirae public WiFi network, beginning in 2018.

International students
Kim Il-sung University first began admitting international students in 1995; as of 2019, about 5000 international students from 30 countries have studied at the university. Prior to the COVID-19 pandemic, there were estimated to be about 100 foreign students at Kim Il-Sung University, the majority of whom were Chinese.

International students at Kim Il-Sung University live alongside specially trained and vetted local students called tongsuksaeng, who are there to act as hosts and to teach the Korean language and culture.

Foreign students seeking to undertake postgraduate studies at Kim Il-Sung University are required to provide their birth certificate, a letter of intent, their undergraduate certificate(s), a police certificate stating that the applicant does not have a criminal record in their home country, medical records certifying the applicant had a recent health examination, details of their financial background to show how they will be financing their education in North Korea, as well as a letter vouching for the applicant's Korean language ability.

Departments

Social sciences
Finance
Foreign languages and Literature
Economics
History
Korean language and Literature
Law
Philosophy

Natural sciences

Chemistry
Electronics and Automation
Energy Science
Forest Science
Geography
Geo-environmental Science
Geology
Computer Science
Life Science
Materials Science
Mathematics
Mechanics
Physics

Others
Distance Education
Education

Notable alumni

 An Kyong-ho, Chief Director of the Committee for the Peaceful Reunification of the Fatherland
 Kim Jong-il, former leader of North Korea, attended 1960–1964
 Kim Jong-un, Supreme Leader of North Korea since December 2011, may have attended 2002–2007.
 Kim Pyong-il, half-brother of Kim Jong-il and ambassador to Czech Republic
 Kim Yo-jong, sister of Kim Jong-un, said to have studied Computer Technology alongside Japanese abductee Megumi Yokota's daughter, Kim Eun-gyon.
 Kyong Won-ha, nuclear scientist
 Andrei Lankov, Kookmin University professor and former Australian National University lecturer, attended as an exchange student in 1985
 Rüdiger Frank, Professor for East Asian Economy and Society, attended as an exchange student in 1991/1992
 Paek Nam-sun, former Minister of Foreign Affairs
 Sin Son-ho, previous Permanent Representative of North Korea to the United Nations
 Zhang Dejiang, former Chairman of the Standing Committee of the National People's Congress and former member of Politburo Standing Committee of the Chinese Communist Party.
 Ri Sol-ju, first lady of North Korea and wife of North Korean leader Kim Jong-un.
 Thae Jong-su, North Korean politician

See also
 List of universities in North Korea
 Pyongyang University of Science and Technology
 Education in North Korea

References

Works cited

Further reading

External links

 
 Official website of the Telecommunications College of Kim Il Sung University 
 360 degree panorama of the Kim Il-sung University Main Building
 1996 article from the Korean Central News Agency
 "Kim Il-sung University" by Andrei Lankov  11 March 2008
 김일성종합대학 (金日成綜合大學) from Naver Encyclopedia 
 The Pyongyang Youth and Kim Il Sung University, Daily NK, 21 September 2006
 Photo of the entrance

Kim Il Sung University picture album at Naenara

 
Education in Pyongyang
Universities in North Korea
Educational institutions established in 1946
Kim Il-sung
1946 establishments in Korea